The Job is an American single-camera sitcom that aired on ABC between March 14, 2001 and April 24, 2002. Several of the principal actors went on to either star or guest star in the FX network's Denis Leary-produced Rescue Me. In Rescue Me, the lead character (played by Leary) is very similar to Mike McNeil, but is a fireman rather than a police officer.

Summary
The series follows a New York City police officer named Mike McNeil (Denis Leary) – who indulges in adultery, alcohol, cigarettes, and prescription drug abuse – and his fellow bumbling detective pals.  The show, which appeared to borrow the tone and look of NYPD Blue for semi-satirical purposes, was built around the Mike McNeil character, but relied on a strong ensemble cast.

Cast
Denis Leary as Det. Mike McNeil
Bill Nunn as Det. Terrence Phillips
Lenny Clarke as Det. Frank Harrigan
Karyn Parsons as Toni
Diane Farr as Det. Jan Fendrich
Adam Ferrara as Det. Tommy Manetti
John Ortiz as Det. Ruben Sommariba
Julian Acosta as Al Rodriguez
Wendy Makkena as Karen McNeil
Keith David as Lt. Williams

Episodes

Season 1 (2001)

Season 2 (2002)

Home media
The complete series (19 episodes) was released on DVD in the United States in May 2005.

External links
 

2001 American television series debuts
2002 American television series endings
2000s American single-camera sitcoms
American Broadcasting Company original programming
Television series by ABC Studios
Fictional portrayals of the New York City Police Department
English-language television shows
Television series by DreamWorks Television
Television shows set in New York City
Television shows filmed in New York (state)